Sunday Adedayo Adewusi (6 December 1936 – 26 January 2016) was a Nigerian policeman and former Inspector General of Police. He was appointed in 1981 to succeed Adamu Suleiman and was succeeded by Etim Inyang in 1983. He died at the age of 79 in 2016.
He was born in Nassarawa state of Nigeria.

Early life
He started his education at Mada Station between 1944 and 1948, after which he proceeded to Baptist Day School, Jos where he stayed and completed his standard six between 1949 and 1950. He has his secondary education at Keffi from 1951 to 1956.

Police Force
He joined the Nigeria Police Force and had his police training at the Police College from 1957 to 1958 as a cadet sub-inspector. At the police college, he won the cane of honour. In 1965, he went to Police staff college in Scotland. He also studied operation of force at East Riding Constabulary of Yorkshire. At age 32 he was appointed Commissioner of Police, and at age 45 he was appointed Inspector General of Police.

References

Nigerian police chiefs
People from Ogbomosho
Yoruba police officers
2016 deaths
1936 births